Carbenzide (INN), also known as carbazic acid, is a hydrazine derivative monoamine oxidase inhibitor (MAOI) antidepressant which was never marketed.

See also 
 Monoamine oxidase inhibitor
 Hydrazine (antidepressant)

References 

Antidepressants
Carboxylic acids
Hydrazides
Monoamine oxidase inhibitors